Aleksey Semyonov  is an Uzbekistani football defender who played for Uzbekistan in the 1996 Asian Cup. He also played for FC Neftchi.

External links

1968 births
Living people
Association football defenders
Soviet footballers
Uzbekistani footballers
Uzbekistan international footballers
Uzbekistani people of Russian descent
Neftçi PFK players
Footballers at the 1998 Asian Games
Asian Games competitors for Uzbekistan